Iván Peñaranda Llauradó (born 6 March 1981) is a Spanish retired footballer who played as a forward.

After signing a contract with A.C. Milan at the age of 19, his career never developed, as he played for mostly in the lower leagues of his country – which included spells in amateur football – and abroad. In Spain, he played in four different divisions, but never in La Liga.

Club career
Born in Santa Eulàlia de Ronçana, Barcelona, Catalonia, Peñaranda was brought up at FC Barcelona, where he played alongside the likes of Gabri, Gerard or Carles Puyol. In the summer of 1998 he and his family moved to the Balearic Islands, and the 17-year-old signed with local RCD Mallorca, being assigned to its reserves in the second division where he played with another future Spanish international, Diego Tristán; he was not, however, very successful, dealing with some injuries.

In September 2000, A.C. Milan won the race with Real Madrid, signing the young Peñaranda for eight years. Barcelona fought for several weeks for the player's rights over him, so the transfer license was delayed, and he appeared only for the Primavera, adding two first-team friendlies; midway through that season he returned to his country and was loaned to Sporting de Gijón B, in the third level.

Subsequently, Peñaranda began a series of unassuming loans: in quick succession, he appeared for Granada CF (one match played, missing a penalty kick in the 89th minute with the score at 0–0), CE Sabadell FC and Palamós CF. He was brought to the last club as an emerging star by owner/manager Dmitry Pietrman, with the pair quickly feuding, which led to the player's release.

In the 2002–03 campaign, Peñaranda would have his first and only taste of top level football, with Portugal's C.D. Santa Clara. With the Azores side eventually suffering Primeira Liga relegation, his input consisted of one game – 20 minutes, in a 5–0 away loss against Vitória de Guimarães– and he returned to Spain in the summer, playing for division three's CD Toledo.

From there onwards, Peñaranda's career went downhill as he never settled in a team and often changed countries, until his definite release by Milan in June 2006: abroad, he played in Mexico for C.F. Pachuca, Bosnia and Herzegovina for FK Slavija Sarajevo and in Azerbaijan with Neftchi PFK, appearing in the 2005–06 UEFA Champions League preliminary rounds with the latter.

Peñaranda signed in 2006 with Ciudad de Lorca CF, in the Spanish fourth tier. He would continue his career in that level in the following years.

References

External links

1981 births
Living people
People from Vallès Oriental
Sportspeople from the Province of Barcelona
Spanish footballers
Footballers from Catalonia
Association football forwards
Segunda División players
Segunda División B players
Tercera División players
Divisiones Regionales de Fútbol players
RCD Mallorca B players
Sporting de Gijón B players
Granada CF footballers
CE Sabadell FC footballers
Palamós CF footballers
CD Toledo players
CF Sporting Mahonés players
CE Mataró players
A.C. Milan players
Primeira Liga players
C.D. Santa Clara players
C.F. Pachuca players
FK Slavija Sarajevo players
Azerbaijan Premier League players
Neftçi PFK players
Spanish expatriate footballers
Expatriate footballers in Italy
Expatriate footballers in Portugal
Expatriate footballers in Mexico
Expatriate footballers in Bosnia and Herzegovina
Expatriate footballers in Azerbaijan
Spanish expatriate sportspeople in Italy
Spanish expatriate sportspeople in Portugal
Spanish expatriate sportspeople in Mexico
Spanish expatriate sportspeople in Azerbaijan